Juang may refer to:
the Juang people
the Juang language